Calonotos opalizans is a moth of the subfamily Arctiinae. It was described by Rothschild in 1911. It is found in Venezuela.

References

Arctiinae
Moths described in 1911